José Freixo Loreto (born 27 May 1984) is a Brazilian actor. He gained recognition while playing the character Darkson in the telenovela Avenida Brasil.

Biography
Loreto was born in Niterói, Rio de Janeiro state. He graduated in cinema from Casa de Artes Laranjeiras. At age 20 he moved to Hollywood, California, where he worked as a security guard for celebrities like Stevie Wonder and Gisele Bündchen.

Filmography

Television

Film

Theater

References

External links

1984 births
Living people
21st-century Brazilian male actors
Actors from Rio de Janeiro (state)
Brazilian male television actors
Brazilian male film actors
Brazilian male stage actors
People from Niterói